Renuka Singh Thakur (born 2 January 1996) is an Indian cricketer who plays for Himachal Pradesh. Singh was the leading wicket-taker in the 2019–20 Senior Women's One Day League, with 23 dismissals. In August 2021, Singh earned her maiden call-up to the India women's cricket team, for their series against Australia. She made her Women's Twenty20 International (WT20I) debut on 7 October 2021, for India against Australia.

In January 2022, she was named in India's team for the 2022 Women's Cricket World Cup in New Zealand. She made her Women's One Day International (WODI) debut on 18 February 2022, for India against New Zealand.

In July 2022, she was named in India's team for the cricket tournament at the 2022 Commonwealth Games in Birmingham, England. She was the leading wicket-taker at the tournament, with 11 wickets, as well as winning a silver medal with her team.

References

External links
 
 
 Renuka Singh at The Cricket Fanatic

1996 births
Living people
People from Shimla
Cricketers from Himachal Pradesh
Indian women cricketers
India women One Day International cricketers
India women Twenty20 International cricketers
Himachal Pradesh women cricketers
Railways women cricketers
IPL Trailblazers cricketers
Royal Challengers Bangalore (WPL) cricketers
Cricketers at the 2022 Commonwealth Games
Commonwealth Games silver medallists for India
Commonwealth Games medallists in cricket
Medallists at the 2022 Commonwealth Games